Wilburville is a small rural residential locality in the local government area of Central Highlands in the Central region of Tasmania. The 2016 census determined a population of 16 for the state suburb of Wilburville.

History
Wilburville is a confirmed suburb/locality. It was so named for the unofficial caretaker of shacks over many years, Mr Wilbur Anderson.

Geography
The northern boundary is the shore of Arthurs Lake (the lake).

Road infrastructure
The C525 route (Arthurs Lake Road) passes through from west to east.

References

Localities of Central Highlands Council
Towns in Tasmania